Nomura (written: 野村 "field village" or 埜村  "wilderness village") is a Japanese surname. 

Notable people with the surname include:

 Don Nomura (born 1957), Japanese-American baseball agent
 Katsuhiro Nomura, Japanese voice actor, including in the manga series Living for the Day After Tomorrow
 Katsunori Nomura (born 1973), Japanese baseball player and coach
 Katsuya Nomura (1935–2020), Japanese baseball player and manager
 Ken Nomura (born 1965), Japanese D1 Grand Prix Driver
 Kenji Nomura (born 1970), Japanese voice actor
 Kenjiro Nomura (baseball) (born 1966), Japanese former baseball player of the Hiroshima Carp
 Kenjiro Nomura (artist) (1896–1956), Japanese-American painter
 Kichisaburō Nomura (1877–1964), Japanese admiral in the Imperial Japanese Navy and the ambassador to the United States until the attack on Pearl Harbor
 Kodō Nomura (1882–1963), pen-name of Japanese writer Osakazu Nomura, a novelist and music critic in Showa period Japan
 Mami Nomura (born 1964), Japanese actress
 Mary Nomura (born 1925), Japanese-American singer, "the songbird of Manzanar"
Masayasu Nomura (1927–2011), Japanese-American biochemist who made seminal contributions in the field of RNA biology
 Michiko Nomura (born 1938), Japanese voice actress
, Japanese footballer and manager
 Naokuni Nomura (1885–1973), Japanese admiral and naval attache to Nazi Germany
, Japanese Yakuza leader
, Japanese long-distance runner
 Takahito Nomura (born 1969), Japanese baseball player
 Tadahiro Nomura (born 1974), Japanese Judo competitor
 Tatsuji Nomura (1922–2013), Japanese scientist; pioneer in the development of laboratory animals for biomedical researches
 Tetsuya Nomura (born 1970), Japanese game and character designer; works at Square Enix
 Tokushichi Nomura II (1878–1945), Japanese businessman; founder of the Nomura zaibatsu
, Japanese high jumper
 Toshiro Nomura (born 1954), Japanese astronomer
 Toyokazu Nomura (born 1949), Japanese judoka 
 Yasunori Nomura, Japanese theoretical physicist
 Yasushi Nomura, (1842–1909), Japanese politician and cabinet minister
, Japanese idol, musician and actor
 Yoshitaro Nomura (1919–2005), Japanese film director
 Yuka Nomura (born 1984), Japanese actress
 Inoue Masaru (bureaucrat) (1843–1910), Japanese bureaucrat; "Father of the Japanese Railways"; briefly bore the name Yakichi Nomura

Fictional characters 
 , a character from the manga and anime series Great Teacher Onizuka

See also
 Nomura Holdings
 Nomura Securities
 Nomura, Ehime, former town in Ehime Prefecture, Japan
 Nomura Research Institute
 Nomura's jellyfish
Namoura, another name for basbousa
Namora, a character from Marvel Comics

Japanese-language surnames